The Alcoa Hour is an American anthology television series that was aired live on NBC from 1955 to 1957. The series was sponsored by Alcoa.

Overview
Like the Philco Television Playhouse and Goodyear Television Playhouse that had preceded it, The Alcoa Hour was a one-hour live dramatic anthology series presenting both original stories and adaptations of popular works. The three series were essentially the same, with the only real difference being the name of the sponsor.

The series alternated weeks in the same time slot with the Goodyear Television Playhouse until both series ended in 1957.

Notable episodes
The series' premiere episode, The Black Wings, marked the American TV debut of Ann Todd.

The show garnered press in February 1956 for actor Lloyd Bridges' emotional performance in an episode titled "Tragedy in a Temporary Town", directed by Sidney Lumet. During the performance, Bridges inadvertently slipped some profanity in while ad-libbing. Although the slip of the lip generated hundreds of complaints, the episode won a Robert E. Sherwood Television Award, with Bridges' slip being defended even by some members of the clergy. The episode, during which an innocent Puerto Rican man is targeted by a mob for a sexual crime, was cited by the Anti-Defamation League as "the best dramatic program of the year dealing with interethnic group relations."

During the second season, one memorable episode was the 23 December 1956, telecast of The Stingiest Man in Town, a musical adaptation of Charles Dickens's A Christmas Carol, starring Basil Rathbone as Scrooge and Martyn Green as Bob Cratchit. It was the only Alcoa Hour production to be granted an original cast album recording. The Stingiest Man in Town was remade in 1978 as a Rankin-Bass animated cartoon, featuring the voice of Walter Matthau as Scrooge.

Episodes

Series overview

Season 1 (1955-56)

Season 2 (1956-57)

*No information found for this episode.

See also
 Alcoa Premiere
 Alcoa Theatre

References

External links
The Alcoa Hour at CVTA with episode list
 

1955 American television series debuts
1957 American television series endings
1950s American anthology television series
1950s American drama television series
American live television series
Black-and-white American television shows
English-language television shows
NBC original programming
Alcoa